Arun Kurian is an Indian actor who appears on Malayalam cinema. He made his feature film debut through a lead role in the coming of age film Aanandam (2016).

He played supporting roles in Velipadinte Pusthakam (2017), Oru Yamandan Premakadha (2019), Thamaasha (2019), Paapam Cheyyathavar Kalleriyatte (2019) and Hridayam (2022).

Career

A Thiruvalla native, Arun did his schooling in Kuwait till Class 9 and studied in Labour India Gurukulam Public School after that. He earned his masters in business administration from Whistling Woods International Institute in Mumbai while simultaneously assisting in making ad films and sending his profile for audition tests. He made his acting debut as one of the seven lead actors in the 2016 coming of age film Aanandam.  He played  Varun, whom he described as a "less-talking, less-bullshit guy". The film was a commercial success.  He then starred in Lal Jose's Velipadinte Pusthakam in 2017 in which he played Sameer, whom he described as a "gregarious type, a college-going city boy". He had two releases in 2019, Oru Yamandan Premakadha and Thamaasha in which he played supporting roles. He played one of the lead roles in the 2020 release Paapam Cheyyathavar Kalleriyatte.

Filmography

Films

Webseries

Television
2016 - JB Junction (Kairali TV)
2016 - I personally (Kappa TV)
2017 - Kuttikalodaano Kali (Mazhavil Manorama)
2019 - Comedy Nights with Suraj (Zee Keralam)
2019 - Sunday Funday (Amrita TV)

References

External links

Male actors in Malayalam cinema
Living people
1990 births